The Aichi F1A (designated AB-13 by its designers and manufacturers at Aichi) was a prototype Japanese floatplane of the 1930s. A single-engined biplane, the F1A was intended as a short-range observation aircraft suitable for operation off the Imperial Japanese navy's warships, but only two were built, the Mitsubishi F1M being selected instead.

Design and development
The F1A was designed by Aichi in response to a 1935 specification, issued to Aichi, Kawanishi and Mitsubishi for a replacement for the Imperial Japanese Navy's Nakajima E8N floatplanes, which were used for short-ranged reconnaissance and observation missions from the Navy's warships. Aichi at first considered a low-winged monoplane design, the AM-10, to meet this requirement, but this was rejected in favour of a more conventional biplane design, the AB-13.

The AB-13 was a small single-bay biplane of mixed construction. It had wooden stressed-skin wings with plywood skinning that folded to allow easy storage aboard ship, while combat flaps were fitted as the aircraft was required to have sufficient maneuverability for air combat as well as its normal observation missions. The fuselage was of metal construction, with the pilot sitting in an open cockpit, but the observer's position being enclosed. Both float and wheeled undercarriages were designed, with the seaplane having a single main float, while the landplane version had a fixed tailwheel undercarriage. Power was provided by a single Nakajima Hikari radial engine.

Operational history
Two prototypes of the AB-13, designated Experimental 10-Shi Observation Aircraft and with the short system designation F1A were built, the first a floatplane and the second with wheeled undercarriage, both being completed in 1936. Although Mitsubishi's competing F1M1 prototypes had poor stability both on the water and in the air, they had superior performance to Aichi's design. Mitsubishi redesigned its aircraft as the F1M2, eliminating its handling problems, and it was selected for production in 1940.

Specifications (Floatplane)

References
Footnotes
 In the Japanese Navy designation system, specifications were given a Shi number based on the year of the Emperor's reign it was issued. In this case 10-Shi stood for 1935, the 10th year of the Shōwa era.
Citations

Bibliography

 Francillon, Ph.D., René J. Japanese Aircraft of the Pacific War. London: Putnam & Company Ltd., 1970.  (2nd edition 1979).
 Mikesh, Robert C. and Shorzoe Abe. Japanese Aircraft, 1910–1941. London: Putnam Aeronautical, 1990. .

External links
 three-way drawing

1930s Japanese military reconnaissance aircraft
Floatplanes
F1A
Biplanes
Single-engined tractor aircraft
Aircraft first flown in 1936